Stretching Out is an album by Ramsey Lewis' Trio featuring tracks recorded in 1960 and released on the Argo label.

Reception

Allmusic awarded the album 4 stars calling it "among Lewis' strongest from the jazz standpoint, balancing a commercial emphasis on melody with jazz improvising and swinging".

Track listing
All compositions by Ramsey Lewis, Eldee Young and Isaac "Red" Holt except as indicated
 "Li'l Liza Jane" (Traditional) - 3:13   
 "This Is My Night to Dream" (Johnny Burke, James V. Monaco) - 2:34   
 "Scarlet Ribbons" (Evelyn Danzig, Jack Segal) - 3:32   
 "Here 'Tis" - 2:51    
 "My Ship" (Ira Gershwin, Kurt Weill) - 4:14   
 "Put Your Little Foot Right Out" (Traditional) - 2:55  
 "Solo Para Ti" - 2:56  
 "These Foolish Things" (Harry Link, Eric Maschwitz, Jack Strachey) - 3:37
 "When the Spirit Moves You" - 3:43   
 "A Portrait of Jennie" (J. Russel Robinson) - 2:30

Personnel 
Ramsey Lewis - piano
El Dee Young - bass
Issac "Redd" Holt - drums

References 

1960 albums
Ramsey Lewis albums
Argo Records albums